The Gorges family was an Anglo-Norman family with lands in the southwest of England. They obtained the manors of Wraxall, Somerset and Bradpole in Dorset.

Holdings of the family
The family of Gorges derived its name from a hamlet in Lower Normandy, Gorges, Manche near Carentan. It was from this hamlet that Ranolph de Gorges came in the year 1066 to England.

The Gorges family obtained the manors of Wraxall, Somerset and Bradpole in Dorset. Ralph de Gorges was marshal of the army of King Edward I in the wars in Gascony in 1293, and was in opposition to Piers Gaveston, 1st Earl of Cornwall. He was summoned to Parliament as Baron Gorges by writ between 1308 and 1322 and is mentioned in the Nomina Villarum 1315-16.

Knighton, Isle of Wight
The Gorges family obtained Knighton, on the Isle of Wight, through the thirteenth-century marriage of Ralph de Gorges with Eleanor de Morville, heiress of Ivo de Morville.   This was a large manor that had returned as 3 knights' fees in the Testa de Nevill. Eleanor died in 1292, still seized of the manor, having outlived her husband. Her son Ralph de Gorges leased the manor in 1305 to William de Caleshale and his wife for the duration of their lives. Before 1316 the manor had reverted to Ralph de Gorges, knighted sometime thereafter.

Tothill Manor
The family of Gorges was associated with the manor of "Tothill". It cannot be stated with certainty where this was located. There appear to be two possibilities: Tothill, Lincolnshire, between Louth and Mablethorpe, and Tothill Manor in the Isle of Wight. The latter is nearby to Knighton manor, also held by the Gorges family.

Descent
Ralph, 1st Baron Gorges, had a son, Ralph, 2nd Baron Gorges, and 3 daughters, Elizabeth, Eleanor and Joan. He appears to have married off his 2nd daughter, Eleanor, to the young Theobald Russell (1303–1340) of Yaverland, Isle of Wight and Kingston Russell, Dorset, son and heir of Sir William Russell (d.1311), who was possibly his ward, and later settled the manor of Knighton in tail-male on Eleanor's two younger sons (William and Theobald). William Russell, the elder of the two, died without issue, and Knighton Manor was delivered to Theobald in 1343

Ralph, 2nd Baron Gorges, who died without issue in 1330/1, shortly after his father's death, formed the plan of bequeathing the Gorges estates to a younger son of his sister Eleanor on condition that he should adopt the name and arms of Gorges. Eleanor's 3rd son, Theobald Russell II (his 2nd elder brother William having died), then took the Gorges name and founded a second Gorges line, which flourished, based at Wraxall, Somerset.

In 1346/7 Theobald was sued in the name "de Gorges" by Elizabeth, widow of his uncle Ralph, 2nd Baron Gorges (d.1331), for the manor of Knighton. Judgement was given in her favour, but, as she had no issue by Ralph, the manor reverted to Theobald by 1362. On the death of Theobald in 1380, the manor of Knighton, less a dower interest of 1/3, passed successively to his sons Sir Randolf (Ralph?) (d.1382), Bartholomew (d.1395/6) and Thomas (d.1404), all of whom chose to use the Gorges family name alone. Theobald's widow Agnes, presumably the mother of the 3 sons, died in 1400, when her customary dower share of 1/3 reverted to Thomas. Thomas left a son John, who died in 1413 aged only 15, leaving his 10-year-old brother Theobald as heir. In 1462 Sir Theobald Gorges was in possession of Knighton, and probably died without issue (incorrect: had at least Walter, Jane, & Elizabeth [m. Sir Thomas Grenville of Stow, Sheriff] so it is unclear why) as the manor of Knighton reverted via the Russell family to John Haket (d.1498) of Wolverton, Isle of Wight, 1st cousin & heir of Thomas Russell (d.1431) son of Sir Maurice Russell (d.1416).

Gorges of Longford

In the 16th century Thomas Gorges (1536–1610), a son of Sir Edward Gorges of Wraxall, Somerset, by Mary Newton, a kinsman and courtier of Queen Elizabeth I, acquired the manor of Langford, now Longford, in Wiltshire in 1573 and built there Longford Castle. His wife was a Swedish noblewoman, Helena Snakenborg, marchioness (through her first marriage) of Northampton. Due to her influence, Swedish-style architecture was adopted in the construction of Longford Castle. Helena's mother was a descendant of Agnes of Borgarsyssel, a natural daughter of Haakon V of Norway. Helena has a remarkable monument in Salisbury Cathedral.

Gorges Barony of Dundalk
Edward, son of the above-mentioned Thomas Gorges of Langford, was granted the Barony of Dundalk in Ireland. Both he and his son Richard (d.1712) sat in the Irish Parliament for the constituency of Ratoath. The Barony became extinct on the death of the 2nd Baron in 1712, even though the latter seems to have had a son. The tomb of the 2nd Baron of Dundalk can be seen at Stetchworth, St Peter in East Cambridgeshire

Coat of arms

In 1341 Theobald Russell "de Gorges” adopted the Gorges arms used by his uncle and grandfather, that is to say, those taken from their de Morville heiress who brought them Wraxall. In 1347 he was challenged by Sir John Warbleton (or Warburton), a knight from Cheshire who happened to be serving with him at the Siege of Calais, who noticed they both bore the same arms on their shields, "Lozengy or and azure" (a field of gold and blue lozenges). The case was brought before a court of honour convened at Calais and presided over by Henry of Grosmont, Earl of Lancaster which adjudged on 19 July 1347 the disputed arms to Warbleton. Theobald Russell "de Gorges" thus added a "chevron gules" (red chevron) to the de Morville arms as a difference, in order not to contravene the judgement.  Thus the new Gorges arms, known as Gorges Modern, became "Lozengy or and azure, a chevron gules", and one of the more celebrated and historic heraldic cases heard in a military court was recorded. This coat of arms was afterwards used by Sir Ferdinando Gorges. The ancient Gorges canting arms of "Argent, a gurges azure", being a blue whirlpool on a white (or silver) background, gurges signifying in Latin a Whirlpool, had been retained some generations before by the senior Gorges line seated at Tamerton Foliot, Devon, the cadet line having married the de Morville heiress.

The whirlpool arms as borne by the senior branch can be seen in Tamerton Foliot Church of St. Mary as a whorl in the 9th. quartering on the 1617 Coplestone funerary monument. The Coplestone family inherited Tamerton Foliot by marriage to a Gorges heiress. In the form of 3 concentric annulets the arms were formerly visible sculpted on the tunic of the adjacent knightly effigy, said by Raymond Gorges op.cit to represent John Gorges of Warleigh House, lord of the manor of Tamerton Foliot, who flourished at the start of the 15th century, and his wife. Fire damage has since removed all visible traces of any armorial bearings on the knight's tunic. A pair of the wooden roof bosses of the church at Chagford, Devon, display whorls, believed to be the Gorges arms, as the family was connected with that manor.
Ormerod, G.W. in his "Historical sketch of the Parish of Chagford", states that the Gorges family had "a great influence in the parish between 1439 and 1461 being descended in the female line from the Wibberi family".

Notable Family Members
Baron Gorges
Baron Gorges of Dundalk, descended from a coheiress of the last Baron Gorges
Thomas Gorges (1536 - 30 Mar 1610), a courtier and Groom of the Chamber to Queen Elizabeth I[1], and second cousin of Queen Anne Boleyn, mother of Queen Elizabeth I. He was the uncle of Arthur Gorges (see below)
Sir Arthur Gorges (1569–1625) was a poet, translator, and courtier.
Sir Tristram Gorges (1562–1608) was a sea captain under the command of Sir Francis Drake. He fought against the Spanish Armada and was the jailer of Pedro de Valdez.
Sir Ferdinando Gorges (1565–1647), called the "Father of English Colonization in North America"[1], was an early English colonial entrepreneur and founder of the Province of Maine in 1622. Gorges himself never set foot in the New World.
Edward Gorges  (1631-1708),  MP for Somerset.
Samuel Gorges (1635-1686), Edward's brother, judge of the Court of Common Pleas (Ireland).

References

Sources
Victoria County History, Hampshire, 1912, vol.5
Gorges, Raymond & Brown, Frederick, Rev., FSA. The Story of a Family through Eleven Centuries, Illustrated by Portraits and Pedigrees: Being a History of the Family of Gorges. Boston, US, (Merrymount Press privately published), 1944.
Burke, John. A General Dictionary of the Peerages of England, Ireland and Scotland, p. 226, Gorges- baron Gorges, page 226
Burke, John Bernard. A Genealogical History of the Extinct and Dormant Baronetcies, p. 222
Fox-Davies, Arthur Charles. A Complete Guide to Heraldry, p. 153
Lower, Mark Antony. Patronymica Britannica, p. 134
Burke, John. The General Armory, London, 1884, p. 413
Mémoires de la Société des antiquaires de Normandie, 2nd bunch, p. 228
Moule, Thomas. Heraldry of a Fish: Notices of the Principal Families Bearing Fish in their Arms, p. 86

External links
 Full text of "Sir Ferdinando Gorges and his province of Maine. Including the Brief Relations, the Brief Narration, his Defence, the Charter Granted to him, his Will, and His Letters.
 Collections for a Parochial History of Wraxall

 
English families
Anglo-Norman families
English gentry families